Red Rocks College is an at-grade light rail station on the W Line of the RTD Rail system. It is located alongside 6th Avenue at its intersection with Arbutus Drive in Lakewood, Colorado.

The station opened on April 26, 2013, on the West Corridor, built as part of the Regional Transportation District (RTD) FasTracks public transportation expansion plan and voter-approved sales tax increase for the Denver metropolitan area.

The station has received criticism for being "convenient to nothing" as the Red Rocks College campus is uphill from the station, with the only walkway along a meandering street. Other than the college, the land around the station has seen little development. The station also has no park and ride lot and no pedestrian bridge across the 6th Avenue Freeway.

References 

Transportation in Lakewood, Colorado
RTD light rail stations
W Line (RTD)
Railway stations in the United States opened in 2013
2013 establishments in Colorado
Railway stations in Colorado at university and college campuses
Transportation buildings and structures in Jefferson County, Colorado